The 1904 Louisiana gubernatorial election was held on April 19, 1904. Like most Southern states between Reconstruction and the civil rights era, Louisiana's Republican Party had virtually no electoral support. As Louisiana had not yet adopted party primaries, this meant that the Democratic Party convention nomination vote was the real contest over who would be governor. The election resulted in the election of Democrat Newton C. Blanchard as governor of Louisiana.

Results  

General Election, April 19

References

1904
Louisiana
Gubernatorial
April 1904 events